Saurorhamphus (meaning "lizard with a crooked beak") is an extinct genus of prehistoric fish.

References
 

Prehistoric aulopiformes